Pioneer Junction is a census-designated place (CDP) in Lincoln County, Montana, United States. The population was 959 at the 2010 census.

Geography
The community is south of the center of Lincoln County, along U.S. Route 2. It is bordered to the north by the White Haven CDP.

It sits between two creeks, Libby Creek to the east and its tributary, Big Cherry Creek, to the west. Libby Creek flows north to the Kootenai River at Libby and is part of the Columbia River watershed.

Demographics

References

Census-designated places in Lincoln County, Montana
Census-designated places in Montana